The Waikaia River is a river in New Zealand, a tributary of the Mataura River.

The moderate sized Waikaia River rises in swamps and tussock land in the Umbrella Mountains to the east of the headwaters of the Pomahaka River and then flows south for  through rugged native bush-clad hills and then from Piano Flat through farmed areas until it joins the Mataura River at Riversdale.

Its tributaries include Gow Burn, Steeple Burn, Dome Burn, Winding Creek and Argyle Burn with the Dome Burn and Steeple Burn being brown trout spawning streams for the Mataura River system.

Highly regarded as a brown trout fishery the quality of the water in its lower reaches deteriorated in the early 21st century due to the conversion of much of the surrounding farmland to intensive dairy farming.

See also
List of rivers of New Zealand

References

Rivers of Southland, New Zealand
Rivers of New Zealand